Vietnam women's national under-20 volleyball team represents Vietnam in women's under-20 volleyball events. It is controlled and managed by the Volleyball Federation of Vietnam (VFF) that is a member of Asian volleyball body Asian Volleyball Confederation (AVC) and the international volleyball body government the Fédération Internationale de Volleyball (FIVB).

Competition history

Asian Championship
 1996 – 9th place
 1998 – 7th place
 2002 – 6th place
 2006 – 6th place
 2010 – 8th place
 2012 – 10th place
 2014 – 10th place
 2016 – 4th place
 2018 – 6th place

ASEAN Championship
 2016 —  Silver Medal

VTV Cup
 2018 — 7th Place

Current squad
Head Coach:  Phạm Minh Dũng
Assistant Coaches:
 Phạm Thị Kim Huệ
 Nguyễn Công Huy

The following 15 players were called for the 2018 Asian Championship and 2018 VTV Cup.

Notes:
 OH Outside Hitter
 OP Opposite Spiker
 S Setter
 MB Middle Blocker
 L Libero

External links
Official website

volleyball
Women's volleyball in Vietnam
National women's under-20 volleyball teams